Jonathan Levin may refer to:

Jonathan Levin (economist) (born 1972), American economist
Jonathan Levin (teacher), son of Gerald M. Levin, murdered by one of his students
Jonathan Levin (footballer) (born 1993), Mexican footballer
Jon Levin (born 1966), guitarist
Jonny Levin, character in List of Invisible Detective characters

See also
Jonathan Levine (disambiguation)